Solomiya Brateyko (born 24 February 1999) is a Ukrainian table tennis player. Her highest career ITTF ranking was 96.

References

1999 births
Living people
Ukrainian female table tennis players